The Torry Hill Railway is a private miniature railway with the unusual gauge of 9 inches at Torry Hill near Frinsted in the Borough of Maidstone in Kent, England. It operates only occasionally.

History 
The Torry Hill Railway was built in the 1930, as many British narrow gauge estate railways. It is maintained and occasionally operated by a group of volunteers. There is still a turntable, a 100 ft (30 m) long tunnel and a viaduct that has been built from realistically scaled miniature bricks. It is owned by the heirs of Sir Robert Leigh-Pemberton, Baron Kingsdown.

The tracks of the Torry Hill Railway lie on private property, which is not accessible by public footpaths or any right of way.

Photos

Literature 
 Robert Turcan: Sittingbourne Through Time. Revised Edition. Amberley Publishing Limited, 2015.

External links 

 John Zebedee: PhotoStream auf Flickr

References 

Heritage railways in Kent
9 in gauge railways in England
Borough of Maidstone